Anthony Francisco Chavez (born October 22, 1970) is a retired professional baseball player who played 13 professional baseball seasons. In 1992, he made the 2nd Team All Big West Conference out of San Jose State University and a 50th round selection by the California Angels of Anaheim in the 1992 June Draft. He made his major league debut on September 2, 1997, against the Colorado Rockies where he recorded 28 days of major league service. After the Angels he continued his professional career playing one season for the Oakland A's "AAA" World Series Champions Vancouver Canadiens in 1999. He also played two season for the Arizona Diamondbacks "AAA" club the Tucson Sidewinders from 2001 to 2002. He then finished off the rest of his pro career playing in the Atlantic Independent League for the Atlantic City Surf from 2002 to 2005. Anaheim Angels of Major League Baseball.

After Big Leagues
Chavez received his Bachelor of Science in Sports Coaching from the United States Sports Academy and teaching certification from Pima Community College.  Chavez is currently pitching coach at Cienega High School Vail, Arizona; for Head varsity coach for Mountain View High School, Marana, Arizona (2008–2011), Rincon/University High 2013 in Tucson, Arizona, Desert View High School, Tucson, Arizona (2014-2019). "Baseball has given me many opportunities in life and has taught me many life lessons... With a lot of hard work and dedication dreams do come true...I love this game with all my heart."

References

Life And Legacy
Chavez resides in Arizona with wife Stephanie and three children Lute Anthony, Mackenzie Martha and Ava Angelique.

Major League Baseball pitchers
Anaheim Angels players
Baseball players from California
1970 births
Living people
San Jose State Spartans baseball players
Atlantic City Surf players
Nettuno Baseball Club players
People from Turlock, California
American expatriate baseball players in Mexico
Boise Hawks players
Cedar Rapids Kernels players
American expatriate baseball players in Italy
Lake Elsinore Storm players
Midland Angels players
Tucson Sidewinders players
Vancouver Canadians players